Marco Mathys (born 5 July 1987) is a Swiss footballer who plays for FC Solothurn in the Swiss 1. Liga.

Career

Early career
Mathys came up through the youth ranks of hometown club SC Derendingen.

Concordia Basel
In July 2006, Mathys moved to FC Concordia Basel. In three seasons with the club, he made 79 league appearances, scoring eight times.

Biel/Benne
In July 2009, Mathys moved to Swiss Challenge League club FC Biel-Bienne on a free transfer. He made his league debut for the club on 26 July 2009 in a 2–0 loss to FC Vaduz. He was replaced by David Casasnovas in the 83rd minute. He scored his first league goal for the club a week later in a 3–0 home victory over Stade Nyonnais. His goal came in the 49th minute.

St. Gallen
In January 2012, Mathys was sold to FC St. Gallen for £63,000. His league debut for St. Gallen came on 18 February 2012 in a 6-0 demolition of SR Delémont. He was brought on for Manuel Sutter in the 57th minute. His first league goal came on 31 March 2012 in a 3–2 victory over FC Wil. His goal came just six minutes after being introduced, and made the score 2–1 in favor of St. Gallen. He had been brought on for Manuel Sutter in the 56th minute. In his first season with the club, they won the Swiss Challenge League and were promoted to the Swiss Super League.

Vaduz
In July 2016, Mathys was sold to FC Vaduz on a free transfer. He made his league debut for the club on 24 July 2016 in a 1–1 draw with FC Thun. He was subbed off in the 84th minute, replaced by eventual goal-scorer Ali Messaoud. His first league goal came as part of a hat-trick scored in a 5–1 victory over FC Lugano. The goals came in the 62nd, 75th, and 92nd minutes. Unfortunately, the club was relegated in his first season with them.

He left Vaduz at the end of 2018.

FC Solothurn
Mathys joined FC Solothurn on 12 June 2019.

Honours
St. Gallen
Swiss Challenge League (1): 2011–12

FC Vaduz
Liechtenstein Football Cup (2): 2016–17, 2017–18

References

External links
 
 

1987 births
Living people
Swiss men's footballers
Swiss Super League players
Swiss Challenge League players
FC Concordia Basel players
FC Biel-Bienne players
FC St. Gallen players
FC Vaduz players
Swiss expatriate footballers
Swiss expatriate sportspeople in Liechtenstein
Expatriate footballers in Liechtenstein
FC Solothurn players
Association football midfielders
Sportspeople from the canton of Solothurn